The 1990 Orlando Lions season was the third season of the team in the newly formed American Professional Soccer League.  In the previous year, the club fielded the team in the American Soccer League which then merged with the Western Soccer Alliance to form the new APSL.  In the inaugural year of the new league, the team finished in third place in the Southern Division of the league.  At the end of the year, the team merged with the Fort Lauderdale Strikers, creating a new unified team and club.

Background

Review

Competitions

APSL regular season

League standings

East (American Soccer League) Conference
Points:
Win: 3
Shoot out win: 2
Shoot out loss: 1

North Division

South Division

West (Western Soccer League) Conference
Points:
Win: 6
Shoot out win: 4
Shoot out loss: 2
1 bonus point per goal scored in regulation, maximum of 3 per game

North Division

South Division

Results summaries

Results by round

Match reports

APSL Playoffs

Bracket

Match reports

Statistics

Transfers

References 

1990
Fort Lauderdale Strikers
Orlando